Charles Hugh Francis  (15 July 1924 – 14 August 2009) was an Australian politician.

He was born in Belgrave to medical practitioner Shirley Elliston Francis and Constance Mary Varley. He was educated at Belgrave, Camberwell and Melbourne Grammar Schools before studying at the University of Sydney, where he received bachelor's degrees of Arts, Law and Commerce. From 1942 to 1945 he served in the Royal Australian Air Force. He was a barrister from 1949, and on 28 October 1953 married Babette Avita Saldanha, with whom he had eight children. A member of the Liberal Party, he was Chairman of the Monash electoral committee from 1969 to 1975 and president of the Stonnington branch for the party from 1970 to 1973. He took silk in 1969, and from 1969 to 1979 was judge advocate with the Royal Australian Air Force Reserve. From 1974 to 1976 he was aide-de-camp to the Queen, and he was also president of the Australian Military Law Society from 1974. In 1976 he was elected to the Victorian Legislative Assembly as the member for Caulfield. In September 1977 he was expelled from the Liberal Party after he abstained from a no-confidence motion over Housing Commission land deals. He remained in the Assembly as an Independent Liberal, but was defeated running for re-election in 1979. In 1983 he was founding president of the Toorak-Malvern branch of the National Party. Francis died in 2009.

References

1924 births
2009 deaths
Liberal Party of Australia members of the Parliament of Victoria
Independent members of the Parliament of Victoria
Members of the Victorian Legislative Assembly
Australian King's Counsel
20th-century Australian politicians
Royal Australian Air Force personnel of World War II